Jason Lo (born 27 April 1975) is a Malaysian music artist, music producer, DJ, entrepreneur and former chief executive officer of Tune Talk. He is sometimes known by the nicknames "LO" and "J Lo".

Early life
Lo was born in Kuching, Sarawak, to a Chinese father and Irish mother. He was educated in Singapore and the United Kingdom. He graduated from the University of Hull with a BSc in Accounting, and then did an MBA in Finance at Webster Graduate School in London, before returning to Malaysia to pursue a career in the music industry.

Music career
In 1996, Lo recorded a ten-track demo in England with his band 'Sunday Man'. In 1997, he recorded another ten-track album with his renamed band 'Drop Circle'. In 1998, the band went their separate ways and Lo returned to Malaysia. His first Malaysian album, the self-financed Days Without Dawn, was released in Malaysia at the end of 1999. Since then, he has released two further albums – Firefighter (2002) and The Fall (2005).

Lo was the first Southeast Asian artist to reach the top 3 on Pepsi Top 20 international chart. His songs 'Evening News' and 'So Julie' were No. 1 on the Malaysian Top 10 for 7 and 5 weeks respectively. 'Evening News' was also included as a pre-loaded track on Creative Labs' original Creative NOMAD Jukebox for release in the US Lo's music videos have had regional airplay on both MTV Asia and Channel V. He has been a winner of the Asian People's Choice Award for Much Music Asia, and at the Malaysian MTV Music Video Awards.

He has been nominated for six AIM Awards (local Malaysian music awards), and for MTV Viewers' Choice Awards. He has headlined live events in Malaysia, and also been an opening act for top international touring bands including Deep Purple, Good Charlotte and Big Country.

Lo is also the CEO of his own record label and event promotion company, Fat Boys Records. He has produced albums for Malaysian bands including Disagree and SingleTrackMind, and organised a series of successful concerts called 'Rock the World', which showcased Malaysian talent.

Lo has also worked as a DJ at the Malaysian radio station hitz.fm, and been a TV talk show host on the show Latte@8 on 8TV in 2004.

Sports
In 2006, Lo teamed-up with the Malaysian politician Khairy Jamaluddin (who he attended high school with in Singapore at the United World College of South East Asia) to produce the reality TV show MyTeam.

The show, which was televised on TV3, brought together a squad of unknown soccer players selected at trials held around Malaysia to form a team to take on the Malaysian national football team in an exhibition match. The event drew much publicity, and MyTeam put up a creditable performance in losing 2–1 against the national side. MyTeam were invited to enter the Malaysian Premier League in 2007. The team merged with an existing club, Perak UPB FC, to form UPB-MyTeam FC, at which Khairy Jamaluddin became the President and Lo the Deputy President. After finishing runners-up in the Premier League in 2007, the club was promoted to the Malaysian Super League for the 2008 season. A second season of the show, MyTeam2, was broadcast in 2007

Finance
In December 2007, Lo was appointed the chief executive officer of Tune Talk, a no-frills mobile virtual network operator, owned by Tune Ventures Sdn Bhd, in which AirAsia Group Chief Executive Tony Fernandes holds a 40% stake. He was later replaced by Ameen Amaedran Abdullah on 12 January 2018.

Legal troubles

In November 2017, Lo denied media reports that he had been detained in Dubai, UAE on September 18, 2017, which alleged that authorities found drugs in his luggage.

Lo said he was sent to the police lock-up in the UAE because he tried to help his friend who attempted to break up a fight and he had grappled with a man who turned out to be an undercover cop. The Inspector General of Police later clarified, during a press conference that Lo’s detention in Dubai was due to a scuffle, and was not a drugs case as earlier reports had suggested.

Lo claimed that the undercover policeman delayed making his statement for weeks leading to a prolonged spell in detention.

In May 2019, Lo threatened legal action against The Star over an exposé claiming a former Telco CEO had “molested and outraged the modesty” of his children.

Lo slammed the English daily for “indecently and irresponsibly” printing a front-page story that he said had omitted key facts.

Lo claimed the journalists who wrote the article, together with the editors, legal team, CEO and shareholders who had propagated the reporters’ “absolute disgrace to the profession” would have to answer according to the country’s laws.

Following the report Bukit Aman Criminal Investigations Director Datuk Huzir Mohamed said they would review 17 police reports made by Lo’s ex-wife, at least some of which had earlier been designated "no further action".

In November 2019, Lo was charged with trespassing into a house and injecting a drug into his body. He pleaded not guilty to charges read in separate magistrates’ Courts.

He was charged under Section 448 of the Penal Code with trespassing into a house in Bangsar Park, Brickfields at 10 pm, on October 30, which carries a maximum jail term of three years or a fine of up to RM5,000 or both.

He also claimed trial to the charge of injecting the drug methamphetamine into his body in the office toilet of the Narcotics Crime Investigation Division of the Brickfields police headquarters on Travers Road, at 5.15 pm, on November 15.

In June 2022, Lo was acquitted of all charges without having to enter a defense as the Judge ruled the prosecution failed to raise a prima facie case against him.

In September 2020, Lo and his colleague Muhammad Yakub Hussaini, both directors of Fat Boys Records Sdn Bhd, pleaded not guilty at the Sessions Court to a charge of breach of trust of money belonging to a recording company amounting to RM232,500, by fraudulently utilising the money for personal use.

In August 2021, The Vibes reported that Lo would be suing national news agency Bernama over alleged defamatory statements contained in their news reports made in November 2019 and September 2020.

Album

Album sales
 Lo's biggest hit is "Evening News" from the album, "Days Without Dawn". The album sold over 10,000 copies to date.
 Meanwhile, "The Fall" sold 5,000 copies despite rampant digital downloads.

Awards and accolades
 Sarawak Youth Icon and Sports Award 2011
 Youth Icon – Entrepreneurship

References

External links 
 The official Jason Lo website 
 Review of The Fall
 Fat Boys Records website
 MyTeam website
 Tune Talk website

Malaysian male singer-songwriters
Malaysian singer-songwriters
Malaysian radio announcers
Malaysian television personalities
Malaysian people of Chinese descent
Malaysian people of Irish descent
Alumni of the University of Hull
Living people
People from Kuching
People from Sarawak
1975 births
Malaysian rock singers